Melicope jugosa is a species of plant in the family Rutaceae. It is endemic to Borneo  where it is confined to Sabah.

References

jugosa
Endemic flora of Borneo
Flora of Sabah
Vulnerable plants
Taxonomy articles created by Polbot